Last Empress may refer to:

Empress Wanrong (1906–1946), empress of Puyi, the last Emperor of China
The Last Empress (film), 1987 Chinese film starring Pan Hong as Empress Wanrong
The Last Empress (musical), 1995 musical about Empress Myeongseong of Korea
The Last Empress (novel), 2007  historical novel by Anchee Min on the Empress Dowager Cixi of China
The Last Empress: Madame Chiang Kai-shek and the Birth of Modern China, 2009 biography of Soong May-ling
The Last Empress (TV series), a 2018 South Korean television series